The Arab Rugby Sevens Men's Tournament, is an annual rugby sevens tournament involving Arab nations, organised by the Arab Rugby Federation. It is contested on an annual basis.

Results by year

Team Records 

<div id="*">* hosts

See also
Arab Rugby Sevens Women's Tournament
Africa Men's Sevens
Asia Rugby Sevens Series

External links
البطولات العربية لسباعيات الرجبي - ARF official website
Arab Championship Overview - rugbyarchive.net

Rugby sevens competitions
Rugby union competitions for national teams
2015 establishments in Asia